Forward Township may refer to:

 Forward Township, Wells County, North Dakota, in Wells County, North Dakota
Forward Township, Allegheny County, Pennsylvania
Forward Township, Butler County, Pennsylvania

Township name disambiguation pages